Eupithecia rubellata is a moth in the family Geometridae. It is found in Central Asia, including Tibet, Mongolia and the western Himalayas.

References

Moths described in 1904
rubellata
Moths of Asia